Deeside is a book which was published in 1911 describing the geography and history of Deeside in Aberdeenshire, Scotland.

It is a wide-ranging book which describes the geography of the Dee Valley from the source of the River Dee in the Cairngorms to its mouth at Aberdeen as well as its history.

Table of contents
 Chapter 1 - Introductory
 Chapter 2 - The Sources - The Aberdeenshire Highlands
 Chapter 3 - Braemar - The Jacobites
 Chapter 4 - Invercauld To Balmoral
 Chapter 5 - Balmoral - The Royal Residence
 Chapter 6 - Crathie Church - Abergeldie Castle
 Chapter 7 - Lochnagar - Glenmuick
 Chapter 8 - Ballater
 Chapter 9 - Aboyne And Glentanar
 Chapter 10 - Aboyne To Banchory
 Chapter 11 - Banchory - Crathes Castle
 Chapter 12 - Lower Deeside - Drum Castle

1911 non-fiction books
Books about Scotland